In mathematics, a plane is a two-dimensional space or flat surface that extends indefinitely. 
A plane is the two-dimensional analogue of a point (zero dimensions), a line (one dimension) and three-dimensional space. 

When working exclusively in two-dimensional Euclidean space, the definite article is used, so the Euclidean plane refers to the whole space. 

Many fundamental tasks in mathematics, geometry, trigonometry, graph theory, and graphing are performed in a two-dimensional or planar space.

Euclidean plane

Embedding in three-dimensional space

Elliptic plane

Projective plane

Further generalizations
In addition to its familiar geometric structure, with isomorphisms that are isometries with respect to the usual inner product, the plane may be viewed at various other levels of abstraction. Each level of abstraction corresponds to a specific category.

At one extreme, all geometrical and metric concepts may be dropped to leave the topological plane, which may be thought of as an idealized homotopically trivial infinite rubber sheet, which retains a notion of proximity, but has no distances. The topological plane has a concept of a linear path, but no concept of a straight line. The topological plane, or its equivalent the open disc, is the basic topological neighborhood used to construct surfaces (or 2-manifolds) classified in low-dimensional topology. Isomorphisms of the topological plane are all continuous bijections. The topological plane is the natural context for the branch of graph theory that deals with planar graphs, and results such as the four color theorem.

The plane may also be viewed as an affine space, whose isomorphisms are combinations of translations and non-singular linear maps. From this viewpoint there are no distances, but collinearity and ratios of distances on any line are preserved.

Differential geometry views a plane as a 2-dimensional real manifold, a topological plane which is provided with a differential structure. Again in this case, there is no notion of distance, but there is now a concept of smoothness of maps, for example a differentiable or smooth path (depending on the type of differential structure applied). The isomorphisms in this case are bijections with the chosen degree of differentiability.

In the opposite direction of abstraction, we may apply a compatible field structure to the geometric plane, giving rise to the complex plane and the major area of complex analysis. The complex field has only two isomorphisms that leave the real line fixed, the identity and conjugation.

In the same way as in the real case, the plane may also be viewed as the simplest, one-dimensional (over the complex numbers) complex manifold, sometimes called the complex line. However, this viewpoint contrasts sharply with the case of the plane as a 2-dimensional real manifold. The isomorphisms are all conformal bijections of the complex plane, but the only possibilities are maps that correspond to the composition of a multiplication by a complex number and a translation.

In addition, the Euclidean geometry (which has zero curvature everywhere) is not the only geometry that the plane may have. The plane may be given a spherical geometry by using the stereographic projection. This can be thought of as placing a sphere tangent to the plane (just like a ball on the floor), removing the top point, and projecting the sphere onto the plane from this point. This is one of the projections that may be used in making a flat map of part of the Earth's surface. The resulting geometry has constant positive curvature.

Alternatively, the plane can also be given a metric which gives it constant negative curvature giving the hyperbolic plane. The latter possibility finds an application in the theory of special relativity in the simplified case where there are two spatial dimensions and one time dimension. (The hyperbolic plane is a timelike hypersurface in three-dimensional Minkowski space.)

Topological and differential geometric notions
The one-point compactification of the plane is homeomorphic to a sphere (see stereographic projection); the open disk is homeomorphic to a sphere with the "north pole" missing; adding that point completes the (compact) sphere. The result of this compactification is a manifold referred to as the Riemann sphere or the complex projective line. The projection from the Euclidean plane to a sphere without a point is a diffeomorphism and even a conformal map.

The plane itself is homeomorphic (and diffeomorphic) to an open disk. For the hyperbolic plane such diffeomorphism is conformal, but for the Euclidean plane it is not.

See also
Affine plane
Hyperbolic plane
Geometric space

References

Mathematics